Gossip is an instant messaging client for Unix-like operating systems. It uses XMPP protocol and adheres to GNOME's published human interface guidelines. It is written in the C programming language, and its main developer is Mikael Hallendal, founder of Imendio.

Features 
Among its features are:
 Presence of your contacts
 Send and receive messages
 Group chatting
 Keeping all of your conversations logged
 Sound notification
 Compliance with GNOME's Human Interface Guidelines

See also 

 List of XMPP client software

References

External links
 

Free XMPP clients
GNOME Applications
Applications using D-Bus
Instant messaging clients that use GTK